Ernest Mignard (17 November 1905 – 4 August 1982) was a French boxer. He competed in the men's bantamweight event at the 1928 Summer Olympics. At the 1928 Summer Olympics, he lost to Jack Garland of Great Britain.

References

External links
 

1905 births
1982 deaths
French male boxers
Olympic boxers of France
Boxers at the 1928 Summer Olympics
Place of birth missing
Bantamweight boxers